Ludens is a genus of skippers in the family Hesperiidae.

Species
Recognised species in the genus Ludens include:
 Ludens levina (Plötz, 1884)
 Ludens ludens  (Mabille, 1891)
 Ludens petrovna (Schaus, 1902) – Petrovna skipper – southern Mexico to southern Brazil

References

Natural History Museum Lepidoptera genus database

Hesperiinae
Hesperiidae genera